Hibaldstow Bridge is an iron arch bridge that spans the River Ancholme, near the villages of Hibaldstow, in North Lincolnshire, and North Kelsey, in the West Lindsey district of Lincolnshire. A plaque mounted in the centre of the bridge reads "Erected By JTB Porter & Co. 1889 Lincoln".

The bridge is a British Listed Building, and was Grade II listed on 6 January 1987. Its Historic England ID is 166019.

The last part of the single-track road leading to the bridge from North Kelsey, known as Starham Road, is not asphalted and can be dangerous during adverse weather conditions as it runs on top of the embankment. It is, in places, badly potholed. On maps, the riverside stretch of road is either not marked, or shown as being of minimal quality.

The bridge was used as the site to burn a Ford Transit Van involved in the burglary of an ATM in the second half of 2019. The bridge is now unusable as there are three large holes burnt into it.

References

Bridges in Lincolnshire
Bridges completed in 1899
Grade II listed buildings in Lincolnshire
Grade II listed bridges
Borough of North Lincolnshire
1899 establishments in England